The Melbourne–Voyager collision, also known as the Melbourne–Voyager incident or simply the Voyager incident, was a collision between two warships of the Royal Australian Navy (RAN); the aircraft carrier  and the destroyer .

On the evening of 10 February 1964, the two ships were performing manoeuvres off Jervis Bay. Melbourne aircraft were performing flying exercises, and Voyager had been given the task of plane guard, and was positioned behind and to port (left) of the carrier in order to rescue the crew of any ditching or crashing aircraft. After a series of turns effected to reverse the courses of the two ships, Voyager ended up ahead and to starboard (right) of the carrier. The destroyer was ordered to resume plane guard position, which would involve turning to starboard, away from the carrier, then looping around behind. Instead, Voyager began a starboard turn, but then came around to port. The bridge crew on Melbourne assumed that Voyager was zig-zagging to let the carrier overtake her, and would then assume her correct position. Senior personnel on Voyager were not paying attention to the manoeuvre. At 20:55, officers on both ships began desperate avoiding manoeuvres, but by then a collision was inevitable.

Melbourne struck Voyager at 20:56, with the carrier's bow striking just behind the bridge and cutting the destroyer in two. Of the 314 aboard Voyager, 82 were killed, most of whom died immediately or were trapped in the heavy bow section, which sank after 10 minutes. The rest of the ship sank after midnight. Melbourne, although damaged, suffered no fatalities, and was able to sail to Sydney the next morning with most of the Voyager survivors aboard – the rest had been taken to the naval base .

The RAN proposed a board of inquiry to investigate the collision, but a series of incidents during the 1950s and 1960s had led to a public mistrust of Navy-run investigations, and as proposals for an inquiry supervised by a federal judge were not acted upon, a full royal commission became the only avenue for an externally supervised inquiry. The four-month Royal Commission, headed by Sir John Spicer, concluded that Voyager was primarily at fault for failing to maintain effective situational awareness, but also criticised Melbourne captain, John Robertson, and his officers for not alerting the destroyer to the danger they were in. Robertson was posted to a shore base and banned from serving again at sea; he resigned soon afterwards. Opinions were that the Royal Commission had been poorly handled and Robertson had been made a scapegoat.

Increasing pressure over the results of the first Royal Commission, along with allegations by former Voyager executive officer Peter Cabban that Captain Duncan Stevens was unfit for command, prompted a second Royal Commission in 1967: the only time in Australian history that two Royal Commissions have been held to investigate the same incident. Although Cabban's claims revolved primarily around Stevens' drinking to excess, the second Royal Commission found that Stevens was unfit to command for medical reasons. Consequently, the findings of the first Royal Commission were based on incorrect assumptions, and Robertson and his officers were not to blame for the collision.

Ships

HMAS Melbourne 

HMAS Melbourne was the lead ship of the Majestic-class of light fleet aircraft carriers. She was laid down for the Royal Navy on 15 April 1943 at Vickers-Armstrongs' Naval Construction Yard in Barrow-in-Furness, England, and launched on 28 February 1945. Work was suspended at the end of World War II, and did not resume until the Australian government purchased her and sister ship  in 1947. The carrier was commissioned into the RAN on 28 October 1955.

The carrier's air group consisted of de Havilland Sea Venom fighter-bombers, Fairey Gannet anti-submarine aircraft, and Westland Wessex helicopters. Melbourne underwent her annual refit from 16 September 1963 to 20 January 1964, with command handed over to Captain John Robertson in early January.

HMAS Voyager 

HMAS Voyager was the first of three Australian-built  destroyers. The first all-welded ship built in Australia, Voyager was laid down by Cockatoo Island Dockyard in Sydney on 10 October 1949, launched on 1 May 1952, and commissioned into the RAN on 12 February 1957.

After returning to Australia in August 1963, after a deployment to the Far East Strategic Reserve, Voyager was sent to Williamstown Naval Dockyard for refitting. Captain Duncan Stevens was appointed commanding officer at the end of that year. The refit was completed in late January 1964.

Collision 
On 9 February 1964, both ships arrived at Jervis Bay for post-refit trials. During the day of 10 February the ships operated independently, or exercised with the British submarine . As aircraft carriers head into the wind to provide maximum assistance for takeoffs, their course can vary widely and on short notice; bridge teams aboard escorting destroyers must thus remain alert at all times.

During the early part of the evening, when both ships were manoeuvring together, Voyager had no difficulty maintaining her position. After the series of course changes which began at 20:40, intended to reverse the courses of both ships onto a northerly heading of 020° for flight operations, Voyager ended up ahead and to starboard of Melbourne.

At 20:52, Voyager was ordered to resume her plane guard station. Voyager acknowledged the order and began turning a minute later. It was expected that Voyager would turn away from Melbourne, make a large circle, cross the carrier's stern, then advance towards Melbourne on her port side. Voyager did turn to starboard, away from Melbourne, but then unexpectedly turned to port. It was initially assumed by Melbourne bridge crew that Voyager was "fishtailing", conducting a series of zig-zag turns to slow the ship before swinging behind Melbourne, but Voyager did not alter course again.

On Voyager bridge, the officer of the watch and the navigator had become distracted, and Stevens was reading navigational charts, impairing his night vision. The port bridge lookout had come on duty while Voyager was turning to starboard, and raised the alarm when the swing back to port brought Melbourne back into view around 20:55. Melbourne navigation officer ordered the carrier's engines to half speed astern around the same time, which Captain Robertson increased to full astern a few seconds later. At the same time, Stevens gave the order "Full ahead both engines. Hard a-starboard," before instructing the destroyer's quartermaster to announce that a collision was imminent.

Melbourne struck Voyager at 20:56, with the carrier's bow cutting into the forward superstructure of the destroyer just aft of the bridge and operations room. The senior officers on the bridge were killed on impact. The mass of the oncoming carrier rolled Voyager to starboard before cutting the ship in two, with the bow passing down Melbourne port side, and the stern down the starboard. Voyager forward boiler exploded, briefly starting a fire in the open wreckage of the carrier's bow before it was extinguished by seawater. The destroyer's forward section sank in 10 minutes, due to the weight of the two 4.5-inch gun turrets. The aft section did not begin sinking until half an hour after the collision, and did not completely submerge until 00:18. In the messages that were sent immediately to the Fleet Headquarters in Sydney, Robertson underestimated the extent of the damage to Voyager and as a result the Captain Cook Graving Dock at Garden Island was ordered to clear the troopship  from the dock to make room for Voyager, and the salvage ship, began sailing south to tow the destroyer to Sydney.

Melbourne launched her boats almost immediately after the collision to recover survivors, and the carrier's wardroom and C Hangar were prepared for casualties. One cutter was able to rescue 40 people before beginning to take on water. The cutter was commanded by Leading Seaman M. A. W. Riseley, who rescued as many survivors as he could despite the weight limit of the rescue boat. The admiral's barge was damaged by debris. Eight helicopters were also launched, but it was then deemed too dangerous to have so many active in such a small area, and they were limited to two at a time. Most of the sailors in the water were unable or unwilling to be rescued with the helicopters' winches, so the helicopters were reassigned to provide illumination of the site with their landing lights. The destroyer escort  was also being prepared to sail. Arriving just before 22:00, Air Nymph collected 34 survivors and attempted to transfer them to Melbourne, but swells pushed the boat up under the carrier's flight deck and damaged two communications aerials, and the SAR boat was sent back to Creswell to offload the survivors. Another 36 were recovered by Air Sprite and transported ashore. Sea searches continued until 12 February, and aircraft made occasional passes over the area until 14 February, looking for bodies.

From the 314 personnel aboard Voyager at the time of the collision, 14 officers, 67 sailors, and one civilian dockyard worker were killed, including Stevens and all but two sailors of the bridge crew. The majority of those killed had been in the forward section of Voyager when the collision occurred, off duty and relaxing or sleeping. Only three bodies were recovered, one of them being that of Stevens. They were buried on 14 February, and the missing were declared dead on 17 February. Memorial services were held around Australia on 21 February. There were no casualties aboard Melbourne.

Repairs and replacement 
At 03:00, after the Voyager survivors were bedded down and the forward collision bulkheads had been inspected and shored up, Robertson handed command of the search operation to Stuart and began to make for Sydney. Melbourne was docked at Cockatoo Island Dockyard for repairs to her bow, which were completed by May 1964. She remained in service with the RAN until 1982, and was sold for scrap to China in 1985.

Duchess was accepted and modernised, and as she was only intended to be in RAN service for four years (although she was later sold to the RAN and served until 1977), the RAN ordered the construction of two improved s (British Type 12 frigates), based on the  design.  and  entered service in 1970 and 1971 respectively.

Investigations

First Royal Commission 
Although a naval Board of Inquiry was suggested by senior RAN officers as the best way to investigate the incident, a series of incidents and accidents during the 1950s and early 1960s had left the general public with a mistrust of navy-run investigations, and Prime Minister Robert Menzies made it clear that an inquiry supervised by a federal judge would be the only acceptable route: anything else would be seen as a cover up. Regulations for such an externally supervised inquiry were supposed to have been drafted following an explosion aboard  in 1950, but they were never enacted, so Menzies' only option was to call for a Royal Commission. The commission, to be headed by former attorney-general Sir John Spicer, was announced by Menzies on 13 February 1964. This commission was directed primarily to investigate the immediate causes of the collision, and the circumstances which led up to it. Secondary considerations included the suitability of both ships for the exercise, and the rescue and treatment of survivors. These instructions were prepared without the consultation of the RAN. The high number of competing arguments slowed the investigation, and it was not until 25 June that the inquiry was ended and the report begun. The Spicer Report was released publicly on 26 August 1964.

The report had a disjointed narrative and repeatedly failed to cite the relevant evidence. In it, Spicer concluded that the collision was primarily the fault of Voyager bridge crew, in that they neglected to maintain an effective lookout and lost awareness of the carrier's location, although he did not blame individual officers. When reporting on the contribution of Melbourne and those aboard her to the collision, Spicer specifically indicated failures of Robertson and two other bridge officers, as they did not alert Voyager to the danger she was in, and appeared to not take measures to prevent Melbourne from colliding. Robertson submitted his resignation from the Navy on 10 September 1964, two days after receiving official notice of his new posting, which he saw as a demotion. The media considered that Robertson had been made a scapegoat for the incident.

Second Royal Commission 
Over the next few years there was increasing pressure from the public, the media, and politicians of the government and opposition over the handling of the first Royal Commission, as well as claims made by Lieutenant Commander Peter Cabban, the former executive officer of Voyager, that Captain Stevens frequently drank to excess and was unfit for command. On 18 May 1967, Prime Minister Harold Holt announced a second Royal Commission into the Melbourne-Voyager collision, with Sir Stanley Burbury, The Hon. Mr Justice Kenneth Asprey, and the Hon. Mr Justice Geoffrey Lucas, as presiding commissioners investigating the claims made by Cabban. It was the only time in Australian history that two Royal Commissions have been held on the same incident, although it was emphasised that the second enquiry was to focus on Cabban's allegations, not the accident itself. The commission opened on 13 June 1967, and hearings commenced on 18 July.

The commission looked at the proposition that Stevens was unfit for command on the evening of the incident due to illness (a duodenal ulcer), drunkenness or a combination of the two, and that the description of the collision in Spicer's report and the conclusions drawn from it were inconsistent with events. Stevens' ulcer had previously hospitalised him, and he had concealed its recurrence from the RAN. There was evidence that Stevens had been served a triple brandy earlier in the night, and a post-mortem conducted on Stevens' body showed a blood alcohol level of 0.025%, though the significance of this figure was challenged by expert witnesses. The hearings lasted 85 days, and the Burbury Report was released publicly on 25 February 1968. It found that Stevens was medically unfit for command, although not impaired by alcohol at the time of the collision. Consequently, some of the findings of the first commission— those based on the assumption that Voyager was under appropriate command—required reevaluation. Robertson and the other officers of Melbourne were absolved of blame for the incident.

Additional evidence 
On condition of anonymity, a doctor informed the first Royal Commission that he had been confidentially prescribing amphetamine to Captain Stevens prior to the collision.  This was a legal drug at the time and was carried in RAN ships' medical lockers. Navy Minister Don Chipp suggested this as an explanation for the contradictory impressions created in the minds of witnesses who reported on Captain Stevens' apparent state of health and demeanour prior to the collision. This evidence was only made public after both enquiries were completed.

Analysis 
While the inattentiveness of the lookouts and bridge crew was a contributing factor to the collision, the exact cause has been difficult to determine, because all but one sailor from the bridge of Voyager were killed. In the immediate aftermath of the collision, five possible causes were put forward:
 communications between the two vessels did not reflect the ships' intentions,
 those aboard Voyager had an incorrect idea of where they were in relation to Melbourne,
 the sea room required for the destroyer to manoeuvre was miscalculated,
 the level of training aboard one or both ships was deficient, or
 an equipment failure occurred aboard one or both ships.
The equipment failure, inadequate training, and miscalculated sea room theories were disproven by the two Royal Commissions, leaving the suggestion that either a communication error aboard one of the ships caused Voyager to manoeuvre in an undesired manner, or the officers aboard Voyager were incorrectly aware of their vessel's position in relation to the much larger aircraft carrier.

Naval historian and ex-RAN officer Tom Frame, who studied the collision for his doctoral thesis, believes that the main cause of the collision was an error in communications: specifically that the instruction to turn to 020° and then assume the plane guard station was garbled on receipt by Voyager. While the first Royal Commission considered the likelihood that the code phrase "foxtrot corpen" was reversed to become "corpen foxtrot" (an order to turn onto the given course), Frame states that it was more likely that the numbers given for the course were misheard or confused with other numbers in the signal as a turn to the south-west (various possibilities offered by Frame would have indicated a turn to the south-west instead of the north-east, with an incorrect heading between 200° and 220°, or of 270°), or that this happened in conjunction with the code phrase error. Former RAN Commodore David Ferry disagrees with Frame's conclusions, claiming that the coincidence of two errors in the same signal was unlikely, and that either error would be sufficient cause for Stevens or the other officers to query the signal.

The idea that those aboard Voyager incorrectly assessed their position in relation to the carrier was most prominently supported by Robertson during the first commission: he suggested that Stevens and the others aboard the destroyer may have believed that they were on Melbourne port bow. The navigational lights aboard Melbourne may have been dimmed (there is disagreement on this point), and experimental red floodlights on the flight deck may have been seen and misinterpreted as a port-side navigation light. The second Royal Commission felt that this, combined with the ill health of Stevens, was the more likely cause of the collision. Frame states that for this theory to be plausible, the entire bridge crew had to lose the tactical picture at the same time, which he considered to be too improbable. Ferry is also of the opinion that, unless Melbourne was both in Voyager radar blind spot and obscured by exhaust from the destroyer, it was unlikely that the bridge crew would think they were not to starboard of the carrier.

Ferry favours the opinion that Voyager misjudged the manoeuvring room she had. He claims that the destroyer knew where she was in relation to Melbourne and that the turn to starboard then reversal to port was intended to be a "fishtail" manoeuvre. Voyager was to swing out wide of the carrier, then turn back towards her, cross the stern and assume her position without having to do a loop. However, insufficient time was allowed for Voyager to get clear of Melbourne before turning back to port, so instead of passing behind Melbourne, the destroyer passed in front. Ferry's theory eliminates the need for a double error in the communications signals, and the need for all on the destroyer's bridge to have such a vastly incorrect assumption of where Voyager was in relation to the carrier. In 2014 he wrote a summary of the theories, the suitability of Royal Commissions for this type of investigation and related experience from the later HMAS Melbourne/USS Frank E. Evans collision.

In 2015 Elizabeth McCarthy asserted in her book John Jess Seeker of Justice, the Role of the Parliament in the HMAS Voyager Tragedy that the crew of HMAS Voyager and HMAS Melbourne did their jobs correctly, and did not make an error on the night of the collision. The crew of the Voyager were in fact watching Melbourne and did receive and pass on the signals correctly. This was proven by selected transcripts being included in the book from the publication prohibited pages of the Royal Commission in 1964.  McCarthy also supports the view put forward by the Burbury Report in 1968 that the final order received by Voyager which Voyager acted on, was likely countermanded by Captain Stevens, which put Voyager in the path of Melbourne and collision stations, and that this was a result of his ill health at the time of the collision. An analysis of his last actions and movements in her book does suggest he was unwell and possibly in pain from a reactivated duodenal ulcer. Her book also puts forward the view that Captain Stevens' ill health was known by 75% of those conducting the Royal Commission in 1964. The treatment of the naval personnel at this Commission was described by John Jess as "The greatest injustice carried out in Australian service history."

Aftermath

Awards and honours 
Chief Petty Officer Jonathan Rogers was posthumously awarded the George Cross for his actions during the sinking. Recognising that he was too large to fit through the escape hatch, he organised the evacuation of those who could escape, then led those stuck in the compartment in prayers and hymns as they died. Posthumous Albert Medals for Lifesaving were awarded to Midshipman Kerry Marien and Electrical Mechanic William Condon for their actions in saving other Voyager personnel at the cost of their own lives. The awards were listed in the 19 March 1965 issue of the London Gazette, along with one George Medal, five British Empire Medals for Gallantry, and three Queen's Commendations for Brave Conduct for Voyager personnel.

On 4 December 2015, it was announced that the support centre for the Canberra-class amphibious assault ships would be named after Robertson. Robertson's family and the RSL have called for a formal apology from the Australian government instead, but several government figures have stated that the naming of the centre is a "fitting acknowledgement" of Robertson's career.

Changes to RAN procedures 
Following the investigation, changes were made within the RAN to prevent a similar occurrence. Procedures were created for challenging another ship that was seen to be manoeuvring dangerously, or which had transmitted an unclear manoeuvring signal, and rules for escort vessels operating with Melbourne were compiled. Among other instructions, these rules banned escorts from approaching within  of the carrier unless specifically instructed to, and stated that any manoeuvre around Melbourne was to commence with a turn away from the carrier. The new rules were applied to all ships scheduled to sail in concert with the carrier, including those of foreign navies.

Compensation claims 
Families of those killed in the sinking of Voyager attempted to claim compensation for their losses, while survivors tried to make claims for post-traumatic stress and similar ailments. A 1965 High Court ruling prevented armed-forces personnel from suing the government for compensation, although the wife of the dockyard worker killed in the collision was able to make a successful claim. The ruling was overturned in 1982. Cases for compensation were lodged by Voyager survivors and their families, and during the 1990s, sailors from Melbourne began to make similar legal claims.

Both groups were met with heavy legal opposition from the Australian government, with Commonwealth representatives contending that those making claims were opportunistically trying to blame a single incident for a range of life problems and had fabricated or embellished their symptoms, or were otherwise making not credible claims. In 2007 Peter Covington-Thomas was awarded $2 million in compensation. By May 2008, 35 cases were still ongoing, two from dependants of Voyager sailors killed in the collision, the remainder from Melbourne sailors. A further 50 cases had been closed in 2007 following mediation. A further group of 214 compensation cases related to the incident was closed in July 2009. Some cases had been open for more than ten years, costing the government millions of dollars a year in legal costs. 

In 2008, the handling of some Voyager survivors' cases was investigated by the Law Institute of Victoria, after they made complaints about the discrepancies between what they were awarded and what was received: for example, one sailor only received $72,000 from a $412,000 settlement. In 2014 the High Court dismissed Forster's challenges to the appointment of receivers, and the refusal to issue him with a practising certificate. In 2017 the Supreme Court of Victoria authorised the distribution of $1.8 million to Forster's former clients.

See also

 Melbourne–Evans collision – the second major collision involving HMAS Melbourne
 List of disasters in Australia by death toll

Notes

References 
Royal Commission reports

 
Books
 
 
 
 
 
 

Journal and news articles
 
 
 
 
 
 
 
 
 
 

Websites

Further reading 
 
 
 
 
 McCarthy, Elizabeth, John Jess Seeker of Justice The Role of the Parliament in the HMAS Voyager Tragedy 2015 Sid Harta Melbourne 

Commonwealth of Australia royal commissions
Maritime incidents in Australia
Maritime incidents in 1964
Military history of Australia
Non-combat naval accidents
Royal Australian Navy
1964 in Australia
February 1964 events in Australia
1964 disasters in Australia